Hydrogamasellus is a genus of mites in the family Ologamasidae. There are more than 20 described species in Hydrogamasellus.

Species
These 23 species belong to the genus Hydrogamasellus:

 Hydrogamasellus antarcticus (Trägårdh, 1907)
 Hydrogamasellus antennatus Karg, 1976
 Hydrogamasellus armatissimus Karg, 1976
 Hydrogamasellus avium Karg, 1976
 Hydrogamasellus brevipilus Karg, 1976
 Hydrogamasellus brevispiritus Karg, 1998
 Hydrogamasellus bullarmatus Karg & Schorlemmer, 2009
 Hydrogamasellus calculus Karg, 1997
 Hydrogamasellus cicatricosus Karg, 1976
 Hydrogamasellus coleoptratus (Berlese, 1888)
 Hydrogamasellus conchatus Karg & Schorlemmer, 2009
 Hydrogamasellus contingentis Karg, 1997
 Hydrogamasellus crozetensis (Richters, 1907)
 Hydrogamasellus gaussi Lee, 1970
 Hydrogamasellus iaculi Karg & Schorlemmer, 2009
 Hydrogamasellus longopilus Karg, 1976
 Hydrogamasellus multospinosus Karg, 1976
 Hydrogamasellus nasutus Karg, 1976
 Hydrogamasellus racovitzai (Trouessart, 1903)
 Hydrogamasellus stipulae Karg, 1998
 Hydrogamasellus striatus (Sheals, 1962)
 Hydrogamasellus topali (Balogh, 1963)
 Hydrogamasellus ubatubaensis (Hirschmann, 1966)

References

Ologamasidae